Gong Maoxin and Zhang Ze were the defending champions but lost in the first round to Treat Huey and Nathaniel Lammons.

Andrey Golubev and Aleksandr Nedovyesov won the title after defeating Sanchai Ratiwatana and Christopher Rungkat 3–6, 7–6(7–1), [10–5] in the final.

Seeds

Draw

References

External links
 Main draw

Doubles
2020 ATP Challenger Tour